Ray Gillett (2 February 1917 – 31 August 1995) was an  Australian rules footballer who played with South Melbourne in the Victorian Football League (VFL).

Notes

External links 

1917 births
1995 deaths
Australian rules footballers from Victoria (Australia)
Sydney Swans players